Holy Tuesday, Fig Tuesday , or Great and Holy Tuesday  (lit. 'Great Third (Day)', i.e.,  Great Tuesday), is a day of Holy Week, which precedes Easter.

Western Christianity

In the 1955 Holy Week Reform, the first 31 verses of the 14th chapter of St. Mark were removed. Those 31 verses are retained in the Roman Catholic Churches which celebrate the pre-1955 Holy Week.

In traditional Methodist usage, The Book of Worship for Church and Home (1965) provides the following Collect for Holy Tuesday:

Eastern Christianity

In the Eastern Orthodox Church, Armenian Apostolic church and those Eastern Catholic Churches that follow the Byzantine Rite, this day is referred to as Great and Holy Tuesday, or Great Tuesday. On this day the Church commemorates the Parable of the Ten Virgins, which forms one of the themes of the first three days of Holy Week, with its teaching about vigilance, and Christ as the Bridegroom. The bridal chamber is used as a symbol not only of the Tomb of Christ, but also of the blessed state of the saved on the Day of Judgement. The theme of the Parable of the Talents is also developed in the hymns of this day.

The day begins liturgically with Vespers on the afternoon of Great Monday, repeating some of the same stichera (hymns) from the night before. At Great Compline a triode (Canon composed of three Odes), written by St. Andrew of Crete is chanted.

The Matins service for Monday through Wednesday of Holy Week is known as the Bridegroom Service  or Bridegroom Prayer, because of their theme of Christ as the Bridegroom of the Church, a theme movingly expressed in the troparion that is solemnly chanted during them. On these days, an icon of "Christ the Bridegroom" is placed on an analogion in the center of the temple, portraying Jesus wearing the purple robe of mockery and crowned with a crown of thorns (see Instruments of the Passion). These Matins services are often chanted the evening before so more of the faithful may attend. The Matins Gospel read on this day is from the Gospel of Matthew .

There are various methods of dividing the Gospels, but the following is the most common practice:
Holy and Great Tuesday
Third Hour—The second half of Mark
Sixth Hour—The first third of Luke
Ninth Hour—The second third of Luke
At the Sixth Hour there is a reading from the Book of Ezekiel 

At the Liturgy of the Presanctified Gifts, some of the stichera from the previous night's Matins (Lauds and the Aposticha) are repeated at Lord, I have cried (see Vespers).

References

External links

Great and Holy Tuesday Orthodox icon and synaxarion
Scriptural Reading for the Tuesday of Holy Week  from the Office of Readings (Roman Catholic)
Tuesday in Holy Week Online liturgical resources

Holy Week
Tuesday observances
April observances
sv:Vita tisdagen